This is the discography of German DJ Thomas Gold.

Compilation albums
 One Love (Australia, 2008)
 DJ Series – Thomas Gold (2008)
 Axtone Presents Thomas Gold [Axtone, 2012]
 Armada Invites (In The Mix: Thomas Gold) [Armada Music, 2017]

Extended plays

Singles

Charted singles

Non-charting singles
2021
 Quintino and Thomas Gold - "Quechua" (Spinnin' Records)
 Thomas Gold and Vivid featuring Nico Lucarelli - "Let Me In" (Fanfare Records)
 Thomas Gold, Danny Ores, and Starjack featuring Conrad Brookes - "Dream On" (Fanfare Records)
 Thomas Gold, Uplink, and Matluck - "Yesterday" (Protocol Recordings)
 Thomas Gold, Cuebrick, and Uplink - "Strange Flutes" (Fanfare Records)
 Thomas Gold, R3spawn, and David Shane - "Letting Go" (Protocol Recordings)

2020
 Thomas Gold and Kazden - "Rise Up" (Revealed Music)
 Thomas Gold and Auralize featuring Matthew Steeper - "Pretend" (Fanfare Records)
 Thomas Gold - "Got To Know" (Fanfare Records)
 Thomas Gold - "Live A Little Louder" (Protocol Recordings)
 Thomas Gold and Kosling featuring David Shane - "Escape" (Revealed Music)

2019:
 Thomas Gold featuring Emy Perez - "Ain't Seen Before" (Fanfare Records)
 Thomas Gold and Teamworx - "We Remember" (Protocol Recordings)
 Thomas Gold and Jac & Harri featuring Chad Kowal - "Without You" (Revealed Recordings)
 Thomas Gold featuring Eagle-Eye Cherry - "Get Up" (Fanfare Records)
 Thomas Gold - "Hangover" (Revealed Recordings)
 Thomas Gold and Raiden - "Someone New" (Protocol Recordings)
 Thomas Gold featuring Bright Sparks - "Seventeen" (Protocol Recordings)
 Thomas Gold and Angger Dimas - "Hi Lo" (Revealed Recordings)
 Thomas Gold and Kosling featuring Matthew Steeper - "Wildest Dreams" (Protocol Recordings)
 Thomas Gold featuring Sonofsteve - "Gold" (Armada Music)
 Thomas Gold - "Non-Stop" (Armada Trice)

2018:
 Thomas Gold featuring Graham Candy - "Real Love" (Armada Music)
 Thomas Gold and Corey James - "Orinoco" (Armada Music)
 Thomas Gold - "Begin Again" (Armada Music)
 Thomas Gold - "Take It Back (To The Oldschool)" (Armada Music)

2017:
 Thomas Gold - "Don't Stop (Creepin')" (Armada Music)
 Thomas Gold - "Tumbler" (Armada Music)
 Thomas Gold featuring Mimoza - "Dreamer" (Armada Music)
 Thomas Gold - "You Know" (Armada Music)
 Thomas Gold - "The Chant" (Armada Music)
 Thomas Gold - "Better Versions Of Myself" (Armada Music)

2016:
 Thomas Gold featuring Jillian Edwards - "Magic" (Armada Music)
 Thomas Gold featuring M.Bronx - "Saints & Sinners" (Armada Music)
 Thomas Gold and Rico & Miella - "On Fire" (Revealed Recordings)
 Thomas Gold and Amersy – "Can't Stop This Feeling" (Armada Music)

2015:
 Thomas Gold and Lush & Simon – "Morphine" (Armind Armada Music)
 Thomas Gold and Deniz Koyu – "Never Alone" (Protocol Recordings)
 Thomas Gold and Uberdrop – "Souq" (Armada Music)
 Thomas Gold featuring Bright Lights – "Believe" (Revealed Recordings)
 Thomas Gold, Hiio and Harrison – "Take Me Home" (Armada Music)

2014:
 Thomas Gold featuring Kate Elsworth – "Colourblind" (Revealed Recordings)
 Thomas Gold and Borgeous – "Beast" (Spinnin' Records)

2013:
 Thomas Gold featuring Kaelyn Behr – "Remember" (Axtone)
 Thomas Gold – "Sing2Me" (Axtone)

2012:
 Thomas Gold – "Miao" (Fly Eye)
 Thomas Gold – "The Beginning / Fanfare / Circles" [Included on Axtone Presents Thomas Gold]
 Dirty South and Thomas Gold featuring Kate Elsworth – "Eyes Wide Open" (Phazing)

2011:
 Dirty South and Thomas Gold featuring Kate Elsworth – "Alive" (Phazing)

2010:
 Thomas Gold – "Agora" (Size, 2010)
 David Tort, Thomas Gold and David Gausa – "Areena" (Phazing, 2010)
 Thomas Gold – "Marsch Marsch" (Toolroom, 2010)
 Thomas Gold and Alex Kenji – "What's Up" (Spinnin’, 2010)
 Fatboy Slim and Thomas Gold – "Star69" (Skint Rec, 2010)
 Thomas Gold – "Work That / Kananga" (Toolroom, 2010)
 Thomas Gold – "The Button" (Toolroom, 2010)

2009:
 Thomas Gold featuring Amanda Wilson – "Just Because" (Hed Kandi, MoS, PooleMusic, 2009)
 Thomas Gold – "In Your Face" (Nero 2009)
 Lee Cabrera and Thomas Gold featuring Tara McDonald – "Shake It (Move a Little Closer)" (CR2, 2009)
 Thomas Gold and Matthias Menck – "Everybody Be Somebody" (Incentive, Scorpio, MoS, 2009)
 Systematic and Thomas Gold – "Don't Tell" (Egoiste)

2008:
 Thomas Gold and Eric Smax featuring Inusa Dawuda – "Risin' Sun" (S2G Productions) 
 Thomas Gold and Eddie Cabrera – "Losing My Religion" (Nero, MoS 2008)
 Thomas Gold featuring Amanda Wilson – "Something's Gotta Give" (S2G, 2008)
 Eric Smax, Thomas Gold and Niels Van Gogh Presents City Sneakerz featuring Michael Marshall – "Want 2 Be" (Selected Works)
 Thomas Gold and Montana Express – "To My Beat" (Haiti Groove, 2008)
 Eric Smax and Thomas Gold – "House Arrest" (Selected Works) 
 Dim Chris and Thomas Gold – "Self Control" (Paradise Records)

2007:
 Gold, Díaz and Young Rebels – "Open Sesame" (Blanco Y Negro, Net's Work, Música Díaz, 2007)
 Wawa and Ortega and Gold – "No Problem 2007" (S2G, 2007)
 Björn Mandry and Thomas Gold – "Suppress You" (Flow Vinyl)
 Wawa and Thomas Gold – "Latin Thing" (Haiti Groove)
 Chriss Ortega and Thomas Gold featuring Nicole Tyler – "Miracle" (Houseworks)
 Gold, Díaz and Young Rebels – "Don't You Want Me" (Joia/Cyber, 2007)
 Gold, Smax and Gogh presents City Sneakerz – "You Don't Own Me" (Selected Works, 2007)
 Thomas Gold – "Rescue Me" (Houseworks, 2007)
 Chriss Ortega and Thomas Gold – "The Other Side" (Tumbata Records)

2006:
 Antolini and Moreno and Thomas Gold – "Don't Know Anybody" (Houseworks)
 Montana Express and Thomas Gold – "Don't Know" (Haiti Groove)
 Level K and Thomas Gold – "Animal Love" (VIP Recordings)
 Thomas Gold and Chriss Ortega featuring Tyler – "Hypnotized" (Houseworks)
 Eric Smax and Thomas Gold – "The Feeling / Crucified" (Selected Works)

2005:
 Chriss Ortega and Thomas Gold – "Lov" (Houseworks)
 Eric Smax and Thomas Gold – "S_Punk / Our Roots" (Vendetta Records)

Remixes

References

Notes
 A  "Everybody Be Somebody" did not enter the Ultratip chart, but peaked at number 1 on the Flemish Dance chart.
 B  "The Button" did not enter the Ultratip chart, but peaked at number 19 on the Flemish Dance chart.
 C  "Alive" did not enter the Ultratip chart, but peaked at number 3 on the Walloon Dance Bubbling Under chart.
 D  "Eyes Wide Open" did not enter the Ultratip chart, but peaked at number 10 on the Flemish Dance Bubbling Under chart.

Sources

Discographies of German artists
House music discographies